The Paf Masters is an annual bonspiel, or curling tournament, held at the Vianor Curlingcenter in Eckerö of Åland (Finland). It has been a part of the Women's World Curling Tour since 2017. The tournament is held in a round robin format.

Past champions

References

External links 

Women's World Curling Tour events
Sport in Åland
Women's curling competitions in Finland
Champions Curling Tour events